Mohamed Reda Maarif (Arabic: محمد رضا معاريف; born 28 March 1990) is a professional footballer who plays as a defender for Régional 1 club Vénissieux. Born in France, he holds both French and Algerian citizenship.

Honours 
RC Arbaâ
 Algerian Cup runner-up: 2014–15

Dijon B
 Championnat National 3: 2018–19

References

External links 
 
 

1990 births
Living people
French sportspeople of Algerian descent
French footballers
Algerian footballers
Association football defenders
Lyon La Duchère players
Football Bourg-en-Bresse Péronnas 01 players
RC Arbaâ players
Dijon FCO players
ASM Vénissieux players
Championnat National 2 players
Championnat National players
Algerian Ligue Professionnelle 1 players
Championnat National 3 players
Régional 1 players